Events from the year 1904 in Scotland.

Incumbents 

 Secretary for Scotland and Keeper of the Great Seal – Andrew Murray

Law officers 
 Lord Advocate – Charles Dickson
 Solicitor General for Scotland – David Dundas

Judiciary 
 Lord President of the Court of Session and Lord Justice General – Lord Blair Balfour
 Lord Justice Clerk – Lord Kingsburgh

Events 
 28 June – the Danish liner  is wrecked off Rockall with the loss of 635 lives.
 1 August – a judgement on appeal to the House of Lords in the case of Bannatyne v Overtoun (in which the minority Free Church of Scotland challenged the new United Free Church of Scotland) is delivered.
 17 September – new St Columba Church of Scotland, Glasgow, opened.
 31 December – Glasgow-registered cargo steamers Stromboli and Kathleen collide and sink at Garvel Point, Greenock.
 Hyskeir Lighthouse completed.
 The Edinburgh Museum of Science and Art is renamed as the Royal Scottish Museum.
 Boroughmuir High School, Edinburgh, founded.
 First West Highland White Terrier breed club set up.

Births 
 4 January – Erik Chisholm, composer (died 1965 in South Africa)
 26 April – Jimmy McGrory, international footballer and manager (died 1982)
 28 May – Anne Gillespie Shaw, engineer and businesswoman (died 1982)
 25 June – Patrick Balfour, 3rd Baron Kinross, historian and biographer (died 1976)
 14 August – Lindley Fraser, academic economist and broadcaster (died 1963 in London)
 23 August – William Primrose, violist (died in Provo, Utah 1982)
 20 October – Tommy Douglas, Premier of Saskatchewan and pioneer of medicare (died 1986 in Canada)
 3 November – Jennie Lee, politician (died 1988)
 20 November – John MacCormick, lawyer and advocate of Home Rule for Scotland (died 1961)
 Edward Baird, painter (died 1949)
 Alex Moffat, miner, trade unionist and communist activist (died 1967)

Deaths 
 16 April – Samuel Smiles, author and reformer (born 1812)
 25 May – David Sime Cargill, industrialist (born 1826)
 7 October – Isabella Bird, traveller (born 1831 in Yorkshire)
 12 November – George Lennox Watson, naval architect (born 1851)
 25 December – James Brown, poet and essayist, known as J. B. Selkirk (born 1832)

The arts
 29 February – the Pavilion Theatre, Glasgow, opens as a music hall.
 12 September – the King's Theatre, Glasgow, opens.
 27 December – J. M. Barrie's stage play Peter Pan, or The Boy Who Wouldn't Grow Up premières at the Duke of York's Theatre in London.
 Hill House, Helensburgh, designed by Charles Rennie Mackintosh, is completed.

See also 
 Timeline of Scottish history
 1904 in the United Kingdom

References 

 
Scotland
Years of the 20th century in Scotland
1900s in Scotland